Giancarlo Pasinato (born 20 September 1956 in Cittadella) is an Italian professional football coach and a former player, who played as a midfielder.

Style of play
Although he was initially often deployed in the centre of the pitch as a defensive midfielder, and even wore the number four shirt, which was associated with this particular midfield position at the time, Pasinato was also capable of playing in a free role out wide, essentially acting as a right winger, a position in which he eventually made a name for himself due to his speed and stamina, which enabled him to cover the flank effectively by making forward attacking runs from behind, and then dropping back to cover defensively. He was also a capable assist provider, courtesy of his crossing ability and good feet, which along with his pace and strength, enabled him to get past defenders frequently and deliver balls into the area, despite not being the most gifted dribbler. A tall and physically powerful player, he was given the nickname "Carro Armato" ("Tank," in Italian) throughout his career. He also stood out for his tactical intelligence and tenacity on the pitch.

Honours
Inter
 Serie A: 1979–80
 Coppa Italia: 1981–82

External links
 Inter Profile

References

1956 births
Living people
Italian footballers
Serie A players
Serie B players
A.S. Cittadella players
Treviso F.B.C. 1993 players
Ascoli Calcio 1898 F.C. players
Inter Milan players
A.C. Milan players
Italian football managers
Association football midfielders